I Got You On Tape is a Danish rock band formed in 2004 in Copenhagen originally made up of five members, namely Jacob Bellens (on vocals and keyboard), Jacob Funch (guitar), Jakob Bro (guitar) Jeppe Skovbakke (bass) and Rune Kielsgaard (drums). Jakob Bro left the band after touring their second album.

I Got You On Tape won the "P3 Award" and the accompanying 100,000 Danish kroner on 15 January 2010.

Discography

Albums
2006: I Got You On Tape
2007: 2
2009: Spinning for the Cause
2011: Church of the Real

Singles
2010: TNT

References

External links 
Official facebook page
MySpace

Danish musical groups
Danish rock music groups